Andreas Schäfer (born 5 February 1983 in Daun) is a German footballer.

Career 
He made his debut on the professional league level in the 2. Bundesliga for VfL Osnabrück on 10 August 2007 when he started in a game against SC Freiburg.

References

External links 
 
 

1983 births
Living people
People from Daun, Germany
German footballers
Association football defenders
2. Bundesliga players
VfL Osnabrück players
Karlsruher SC players
FC Ingolstadt 04 players
1. FC Kaiserslautern II players
Footballers from Rhineland-Palatinate